Faucett Mill and House, also known as Coach House and Chatwood, is a historic grist mill, home, and national historic district located near Hillsborough, Orange County, North Carolina.  The mill was built before 1792, and is a -story, heavy timber frame, weatherboarded building.  It is sided alongside a reconstructed mill race and the Eno River.  The Faucett House was built about 1808, and is a -story, Federal style frame dwelling, with an original one-story rear wing.  The house's southwest wing was originally a separate dwelling known as the Naile Johnson House.  It was added to the Faucett House about 1938.  Also on the property are the contributing mill cottage, barn, and a section of the "Great Road."

It was listed on the National Register of Historic Places in 1988.

References

Grinding mills in North Carolina
Houses on the National Register of Historic Places in North Carolina
Grinding mills on the National Register of Historic Places in North Carolina
Historic districts on the National Register of Historic Places in North Carolina
Federal architecture in North Carolina
Houses completed in 1808
Hillsborough, North Carolina
Houses in Orange County, North Carolina
National Register of Historic Places in Orange County, North Carolina